Life on the Flip Side is the thirtieth studio album by American singer-songwriter Jimmy Buffett. The album was released on May 29, 2020, by Mailboat Records.

Commercial performance
Life on the Flip Side debuted at number two on the US Billboard 200 with 75,000 album-equivalent units (including 74,000 pure album sales), marking the singer's twelfth top 10 album and highest-charting album in over 15 years.

Track listing

Charts

Weekly charts

Year-end charts

References

2020 albums
Jimmy Buffett albums
Mailboat Records albums
Albums produced by Mac McAnally
Albums produced by Michael Utley